Cryptocheilus elegans is a species of spider wasp in the genus Cryptocheilus found in Europe.

References 

Insects described in 1806
Pepsinae